Bradesco Seguros, created in 1946 by Banco Bradesco bank, is the largest insurance company of Brazil and Latin America. The company is headquartered in Barueri, São Paulo.

The company operates in the automobile, health, life and patrimonial insurance and has 346 facilities and 34,000 active brokers, in addition to having a network of over 3,600 branches of Banco Bradesco to serve its customers.

References

Financial services companies established in 1946
Companies based in São Paulo (state)
Insurance companies of Brazil
Brazilian brands